Ramón Cabrera Argüelles, D.D., S.T.L. (born November 12, 1944) is a Filipino cleric who served as Archbishop of the Metropolitan Archdiocese of Lipa in the province of Batangas on the island of Luzon, Philippines from 2004 to 2017. Prior to his appointment as archbishop, he was an auxiliary bishop of the same diocese, appointed to that position on November 26, 1993.

Argüelles first appeared in the news for urging Filipinos to boycott Madonna's concert and for calling for prayers for President Ferdinand Marcos after the latter's burial at the Heroes' Cemetery was permitted by the Supreme Court. On February 2, 2017, Pope Francis accepted his resignation as Archbishop of Lipa and appointed Bishop of Daet Gilbert Garcera as Argüelles' successor.

Biography
Arguelles was ordained a priest on December 21, 1969. Arguelles served as rector of San Carlos Seminary from 1982 to 1986. On November 26, 1993, Pope John Paul II elevated him to the office of bishop, and appointed him titular Bishop of Roscrea.

Arguelles was auxiliary bishop of Manila. Afterwards, he took the administration of the Military Ordinariate of the Philippines. In 2004, he was named Archbishop of Lipa succeeding Gaudencio Rosales, who became Archbishop of Manila in 2003.

Arguelles attended Batangas South Elementary School from grades 1 to 4 (1951–1955) and St. Bridget's College from grade 5 to 2nd year high school (1955–1959). He finished 2nd to 5th year high school at Our Lady of Guadalupe Minor Seminary in Makati (1959–1963). He studied philosophy (1963–1966) and theology (1966–1970) at the San Carlos Seminary in Makati.

Arguelles studied for the Bachelor of Sacred Theology and Licentiate in Sacred Theology at the Pontifical University of St. Thomas Aquinas (the Angelicum) in Rome (1972–1976) where he also studied sociology (1974–1976). He studied French at the Universite d'Ete in Paris, France (1973); German at the Goethe Institute, Passau, Germany (Summer 1976); Teresa de Avila at the Centre Spirituel, France (1981–1982); Tertianship at the Nemi Renewal Institute, Rome (July–December 1988); Poustinia at Madonna House, Comberemere, Ontario, Canada (December 1988-February 1989); and apostolic spirituality at St. Bueno's, North Wales (February–May 1989).

Arguelles' priestly ministry began when he served as assistant parish priest at San Jose de Navotas in Navotas, Metro Manila (1970–1972). He also served at these parishes in Germany: Hoxter 1 Luchtringen (1973–1974); Clemenskirche, Hannover (1975); and Grosskollnbach/Isar (1976).

Arguelles was also former prefect and acting pastor of the Guadalupe Minor Seminary (1977–1978). For three years he was priest-in-charge of the Fil-Mission (Mission Society of the Philippines) Seminary in Tagaytay (1978–1981) where he was also professor of Introduction to the Scriptures. He served as rector of San Carlos Seminary in Makati (1982–1986) and professor of Spirituality at the Summer Institute (1983–1985). He was parish priest and chaplain at the University of the Philippines in Quezon City (1986–1988) and then became parish priest of Our Lady of Mt. Carmel, Quezon City.

Arguelles served as rector of the Colegio Filipino in Rome (1990–1994) and became chaplain of Filipinos in that country for two years (1990–1992).

Pope John Paul II appointed him an auxiliary bishop for Manila on Nov. 27, 1993 and he was consecrated at St. Peter's Basilica in Rome. He was appointed head of the military ordinariate of the Philippines on Aug. 25, 1995 and served until 2005.

Since 1995, Arguelles has been chairman of the Catholic Bishops' Conference of the Philippines' Episcopal Commission on Migrants and Itinerant Peoples (ECMI). Since 1988 he has been spiritual director of the National Service Committee of the National Charismatic Renewal Movement.

See also
Our Lady Mediatrix of All Graces

References

External links
Ramon Arguelles CBCP
Catholic Hierarchy Ramon Cabrera Arguelles 
Military Ordinate of the Philippines
Lipa Archdiocese

20th-century Roman Catholic bishops in the Philippines
21st-century Roman Catholic archbishops in the Philippines
1944 births
Living people
People from Batangas City
Roman Catholic archbishops of Lipa